Texas Park Road 68 (Hueco Tanks State Park Road) is a state park road in Hueco Tanks State Historic Site in El Paso County, Texas.

Route description
The southern terminus of Park Road 68 is at  RM 2775 at the southern boundary of Hueco Tanks State Historic Site. It proceeds  northward from there, entirely within the state park.

History
Park Road 68 was established along its current route in 1974.

Major intersections

See also

References

External links

0068
Transportation in El Paso County, Texas